Hårfagrehaugen is a mountain on Kongsøya in Kong Karls Land, Svalbard. It is named after Harald Fairhair, the first King of Norway. The mountain reaches a height of 304 m.a.s.l., and is located north of Retziusfjellet, separated by the valley of Hidalen.

References

Mountains of Svalbard
Kongsøya
Harald Fairhair